Bantam Cider was an independently owned, hard cider company located in Somerville, Massachusetts. They offered three varieties of bottled cider which ranged from 5.4% to 6.9% ABV. Bantam Cider was distributed throughout Massachusetts, Maine, New Hampshire, Connecticut, New York and Illinois.

History

Bantam Cider, founded by Dana Masterpolo and Michelle da Silva in Cambridge, Massachusetts, launched its first product and flagship cider, Wunderkind, in January 2012. In 2013 Bantam Cider relocated to nearby Union Square in Somerville, Massachusetts with the establishment of its new production facility based in the old home of the White Rose Baking Company.  In March 2014 Bantam Cider opened an on-premises all-cider taproom becoming the first of its kind, in Massachusetts

References

External links
 Official Webpage

Alcoholic drinks
American ciders
American companies established in 2012
Food and drink companies established in 2012
2012 establishments in Massachusetts